Lundy is an English island in the Bristol Channel. It was a micronation from 1925–1969. It forms part of the district of Torridge in the county of Devon.

In the 1920s, one self-proclaimed king, Martin Harman, tried to issue his own coinage and was fined by the House of Lords. In 1941, two German Heinkel He 111 bombers crash landed on the island, and their crews were captured. 

In 1969, Lundy was purchased by British millionaire Jack Hayward, who donated it to the National Trust. It is now managed by the Landmark Trust, a conservation charity that derives its income from day trips and holiday lettings, most visitors arriving by boat from Bideford or Ilfracombe. A local tourist curiosity is the special "Puffin" postage stamp, a category known by philatelists as "local carriage labels", a collectors' item.

As a steep, rocky island, often shrouded by fog, Lundy has been the scene of many shipwrecks, and the remains of its old lighthouse installations are of both historic and scientific interest. Its present-day lighthouses are fully automated, one of which is solar-powered. Lundy has a rich bird life, as it lies on major migration routes, and attracts many vagrant as well as indigenous species. It also boasts a variety of marine habitats, with rare seaweeds, sponges and corals. In 2010, the island became Britain's first Marine Conservation Zone.

Profile

Lundy is the largest island in the Bristol Channel. Lundy gives its name to a British sea area and is one of the islands of England. Lundy is included in the district of Torridge with a resident population of 28 people in 2007. These include a warden, a ranger, an island manager, a farmer, bar and house-keeping staff, and volunteers. Most live in and around the village at the south of the island. Most visitors are day-trippers, although there are 23 holiday properties and a camp site for over-night visitors, most at the south of the island.

In a 2005 opinion poll of Radio Times readers, Lundy was named as Britain's tenth greatest natural wonder. The island has been designated a Site of Special Scientific Interest and it was England's first statutory Marine Nature reserve, and the first Marine Conservation Zone, because of its unique flora and fauna. It is managed by the Landmark Trust on behalf of the National Trust.

Etymology

The place-name 'Lundy' is first attested in 1189 in the Records of the Templars in England, where it appears as (Insula de) Lundeia. It appears in the Charter Rolls as Lundeia again in 1199, and as Lunday in 1281. The name means 'puffin island', from the Old Norse lundi meaning 'puffin' (compare Lundey in Iceland). The name is Scandinavian, and it appears in the 12th-century Orkneyinga saga as Lundey.

Lundy is known in Welsh as Ynys Wair, 'Gwair's Island', in reference to an alternative name for the wizard Gwydion.

History
Lundy has evidence of visitation or occupation from the Mesolithic period onward, with Neolithic flintwork, Bronze Age burial mounds, four inscribed gravestones from the early medieval period, and an early medieval monastery (possibly dedicated to St Elen or St Helen).

Beacon Hill Cemetery

Beacon Hill Cemetery was excavated by Charles Thomas in 1969. The cemetery contains four inscribed stones, dated to the 5th or 6th century AD. The site was originally enclosed by a curvilinear bank and ditch, which is still visible in the southwest corner. However, the other walls were moved when the Old Light was constructed in 1819. There are surviving examples in Luxulyan, in Cornwall; Mathry, Meidrim and Clydau in the south of Wales; and Stowford, Jacobstowe, Lydford and Instow, in Devon.

Thomas proposed a five-stage sequence of site usage:
 An area of round huts and fields. These huts may have fallen into disuse before the construction of the cemetery.
 The construction of the focal grave, an  rectangular stone enclosure containing a single cist grave. The interior of the enclosure was filled with small granite pieces. Two more cist graves located to the west of the enclosure may also date from this time.
 Perhaps 100 years later, the focal grave was opened and the infill removed. The body may have been moved to a church at this time.
 Two further stages of cist grave construction around the focal grave.

Twenty-three cist graves were found during this excavation. Considering that the excavation only uncovered a small area of the cemetery, there may be as many as 100 graves.

Inscribed stones

Four Celtic inscribed stones have been found in Beacon Hill Cemetery:
 1400 OPTIMI, or TIMI; the name Optimus is Latin and male. Discovered in 1962 by D. B. Hague.
 1401 RESTEVTAE, or RESGEVT[A], Latin, female i.e. Resteuta or Resgeuta. Discovered in 1962 by D. B. Hague.
 1402 POTIT[I], or [PO]TIT, Latin, male. Discovered in 1961 by K. S. Gardener and A. Langham.
 1403 --]IGERNI [FIL]I TIGERNI, or—I]GERNI [FILI] [T]I[G]ERNI, Brittonic, male i.e. Tigernus son of Tigernus. Discovered in 1905.

Knights Templar
Lundy was granted to the Knights Templar by Henry II in 1160. The Templars were a major international maritime force at this time, with interests in North Devon, and almost certainly an important port at Bideford or on the River Taw in Barnstaple. This was probably because of the increasing threat posed by the Norse sea raiders; however, it is unclear whether they ever took possession of the island. Ownership was disputed by the Marisco family who may have already been on the island during King Stephen's reign. The Mariscos were fined, and the island was cut off from necessary supplies. Evidence of the Templars' weak hold on the island came when King John, on his accession in 1199, confirmed the earlier grant.

Marisco family

In 1235 William de Marisco was implicated in the murder of Henry Clement, a messenger of Henry III. Three years later, an attempt was made to kill Henry III by a man who later confessed to being an agent of the Marisco family. William de Marisco fled to Lundy where he lived as a virtual king. He built a stronghold in the area now known as Bulls' Paradise with  walls.

In 1242, Henry III sent troops to the island. They scaled the island's cliff and captured William de Marisco and 16 of his "subjects". Henry III built the castle (sometimes referred to as the Marisco Castle) in an attempt to establish the rule of law on the island and its surrounding waters. In 1275 the island is recorded as being in the Lordship of King Edward I but by 1322 it was in the possession of Thomas, 2nd Earl of Lancaster and was among the large number of lands seized by Edward II following Lancaster's execution for rebelling against the King. At some point in the 13th century the monks of the Cistercian order at Cleeve Abbey held the rectory of the island.

Piracy
Over the next few centuries, the island was hard to govern. Trouble followed as both English and foreign pirates and privateers – including other members of the Marisco family – took control of the island for short periods. This made the island a profitable location from which to prey on passing Bristol-bound merchant ships bringing back valuable goods from overseas.

In 1627 a group known as the Salé Rovers, from the Republic of Salé (now Salé in Morocco) occupied Lundy for five years. These Barbary Pirates, under the command of a Dutch renegade named Jan Janszoon, flew an Ottoman flag over the island. Slaving raids were made embarking from Lundy by the Barbary Pirates, and captured Europeans were held on Lundy before being sent to Algiers to be sold as slaves. From 1628 to 1634, in addition to the Barbary Pirates, the island was plagued by privateers of French, Basque, English and Spanish origin targeting the lucrative shipping routes passing through the Bristol Channel. These incursions were eventually ended by Sir John Penington, but in the 1660s and as late as the 1700s the island still fell prey to French privateers.

Civil war
In the English Civil War, Thomas Bushell held Lundy for King Charles I, rebuilding Marisco Castle and garrisoning the island at his own expense. He was a friend of Francis Bacon, a strong supporter of the Royalist cause and an expert on mining and coining. It was the last Royalist territory held between the first and second civil wars. After receiving permission from Charles I, Bushell surrendered the island on 24 February 1647 to Richard Fiennes, representing General Fairfax. In 1656, the island was acquired by Lord Saye and Sele.

18th and 19th centuries
The late 18th and early 19th centuries were years of lawlessness on Lundy, particularly during the ownership of Thomas Benson (1708–1772), a Member of Parliament for Barnstaple in 1747 and Sheriff of Devon, who notoriously used the island for housing convicts whom he was supposed to be deporting. Benson leased Lundy from its owner, John Leveson-Gower, 1st Earl Gower (1694–1754) (who was an heir of the Grenville family of Bideford and of Stowe, Kilkhampton in Cornwall), at a rent of £60 per annum and contracted with the Government to transport a shipload of convicts to Virginia, but diverted the ship to Lundy to use the convicts as his personal slaves. Later Benson was involved in an insurance swindle. He purchased and insured the ship Nightingale and loaded it with a valuable cargo of pewter and linen. Having cleared the port on the mainland, the ship put into Lundy, where the cargo was removed and stored in a cave built by the convicts, before setting sail again. Some days afterwards, when a homeward-bound vessel was sighted, the Nightingale was set on fire and scuttled. The crew were taken off the stricken ship by the other ship, which landed them safely at Clovelly.

Sir Vere Hunt, 1st Baronet of Curragh, a rather eccentric Irish politician and landowner, and unsuccessful man of business, purchased the island from John Cleveland in 1802 for £5,270 (£ today). Sir Vere Hunt planted in the island a small, self-contained Irish colony with its own constitution and divorce laws, coinage and stamps. The tenants came from Sir Vere Hunt's Irish estate and they experienced agricultural difficulties while on the island. This led Sir Vere Hunt to seek someone who would take the island off his hands, failing in his attempt to sell the island to the British Government as a base for troops. After the 1st Baronet's death his son, Sir Aubrey (Hunt) de Vere, 2nd Baronet, also had great difficulty in securing any profit from the property. In the 1820s John Benison agreed to purchase the island for £4,500 but then refused to complete  the sale as he felt that the 2nd Baronet could not make out a good title in respect of the sale terms, namely that the island was free from tithes and taxes.

William Hudson Heaven purchased Lundy in 1834, as a summer retreat and for hunting, at a cost of 9,400 guineas (£9,870, or £ today). He claimed it to be a "free island", and successfully resisted the jurisdiction of the mainland magistrates. Lundy was in consequence sometimes referred to as "the kingdom of Heaven". It belongs in fact to the county of Devon, and has always been part of the hundred of Braunton. Many of the buildings on the island today, including St. Helen's Church, designed by the architect John Norton, and Millcombe House (originally known simply as the Villa), date from the Heaven period. The Georgian-style villa was built in 1836. However, the expense of building the road from the beach (no financial assistance being provided by Trinity House, despite their regular use of the road following the construction of the lighthouses), the villa and the general cost of running the island had a ruinous effect on the family's finances, which had been damaged by reduced profits from their sugar plantations in Jamaica.

The letter, dated 15 August 1843 read: "Dear Brother, Please e God i be with y against Michaelmas. Prepare y search Lundy for y Jenny ivories. Adiue William, Odessa". The bottle and letter are on display at the Portledge Hotel at Fairy Cross, in Devon, England.  was a three-masted full-rigged ship reputed to be carrying ivory and gold dust that was wrecked on Lundy on 20 February 1797 at a place thereafter called Jenny's Cove. Some ivory was apparently recovered some years later but the leather bags supposed to contain gold dust were never found.

20th and 21st centuries
William Heaven was succeeded by his son the Reverend Hudson Grosset Heaven who, thanks to a legacy from Sarah Langworthy (née Heaven), was able to fulfill his life's ambition of building a stone church on the island. St Helen's was completed in 1896, and stands today as a lasting memorial to the Heaven period. It has been designated by English Heritage a Grade II listed building. He is said to have been able to afford either a church or a new harbour. His choice of the church was not however in the best financial interests of the island. The unavailability of the money for re-establishing the family's financial soundness, coupled with disastrous investment and speculation in the early 20th century, caused severe financial hardship.

Hudson Heaven died in 1916, and was succeeded by his nephew, Walter Charles Hudson Heaven. With the outbreak of the First World War, matters deteriorated seriously, and in 1918 the family sold Lundy to Augustus Langham Christie. In 1924, the Christie family sold the island along with the mail contract and the MV Lerina to Martin Coles Harman, who proclaimed himself a king. Harman issued two coins of Half Puffin and One Puffin denominations in 1929, nominally equivalent to the British halfpenny and penny, resulting in his prosecution under the United Kingdom's Coinage Act of 1870. The House of Lords found him guilty in 1931, and he was fined £5 with fifteen guineas (£5 + £15.75) expenses. The coins were withdrawn and became collectors' items. In 1965 a "fantasy" restrike four-coin set, a few in gold, was issued to commemorate 40 years since Harman purchased the island. Harman's son, John Pennington Harman was awarded a posthumous Victoria Cross during the Battle of Kohima, India in 1944. There is a memorial to him at the VC Quarry on Lundy. Martin Coles Harman died in 1954.

Residents did not pay taxes to the United Kingdom and had to pass through customs when they travelled to and from Lundy Island. Although the island was ruled as a virtual fiefdom, its owner never claimed to be independent of the United Kingdom, in contrast to later territorial "micronations". 

Following the death of Harman's son Albion in 1968, Lundy was put up for sale in 1969. Jack Hayward, a British millionaire, purchased the island for £150,000 (£ today) and gave it to the National Trust, who leased it to the Landmark Trust. The Landmark Trust has managed the island since then, deriving its income from arranging day trips, letting out holiday cottages and from donations. In May 2015 a sculpture by Antony Gormley was erected on Lundy. It is one of five life-sized sculptures, Land, placed near the centre and at four compass points of the UK in a commission by the Landmark Trust, to celebrate its 50th anniversary. The others are at Lowsonford (Warwickshire), Saddell Bay (Scotland), the Martello Tower (Aldeburgh, Suffolk), and Clavell Tower (Kimmeridge Bay, Dorset).

The island is visited by over 20,000 day trippers a year, but during September 2007 had to be closed for several weeks owing to an outbreak of norovirus.

An inaugural Lundy Island half-marathon took place on 8 July 2018 with 267 competitors.

Wrecked ships and aircraft

Wreck of Jenny
Near the end of a voyage from Africa to Bristol, the British merchant ship   was wrecked on the coast of Lundy in January 1797. Only her first mate survived. The site of the tragedy has since been known as Jenny's Cove.

Wreck of Battleship Montagu

Steaming in heavy fog, the Royal Navy battleship  ran hard aground near Shutter Rock on Lundy's southwest corner at about 2:00 a.m. on 30 May 1906. Thinking they were aground at Hartland Point on the English mainland, a landing party went ashore for help, only finding out where they were after encountering the lighthouse keeper at the island's north light.

Strenuous efforts by the Royal Navy to salvage the badly damaged battleship during the summer of 1906 failed, and in 1907 it was decided to give up and sell her for scrap. Montagu was scrapped at the scene over the next fifteen years. Diving clubs still visit the site, where armour plate and live 12-inch (305-millimetre) shells remain on the seabed.

Remains of a German Heinkel 111H bomber

During the Second World War two German Heinkel He 111 bombers crash landed on the island in 1941. The first was on 3 March, when all the crew survived and were taken prisoner.

The second was on 1 April when the pilot was killed and the other crew members were taken prisoner. This plane had bombed a British ship and one engine was damaged by anti aircraft fire, forcing it to crash land. Most of the metal was salvaged, although a few remains can be found at the crash site to date. Reportedly, to avoid reprisals, the crew concocted the story that they were on a reconnaissance mission.

Geography

A few yards off the northeastern coast is Seal's Rock which is so called after the seals which rest on and inhabit the islet. Near the jetty is a small pocket beach.

Geology
The island is primarily composed of granite of 59.8 ± 0.4 – 58.4 ± 0.4 million years (from the Palaeocene epoch), with slate at the southern end; the plateau soil is mainly loam, with some peat. Among the igneous dykes cutting the granite are a small number composed of a unique orthophyre. It is possible, based on emplacement of magmas of the basalt, trachyte and rhyolite types at a high levels in earth's crust, that a volcano system existed above Lundy. This was given the name Lundyite in 1914, although the term – never precisely defined – has since fallen into disuse.

Climate
Lundy lies on the line where the North Atlantic Ocean and the Bristol Channel meet, so it has quite a mild climate. The island has cool, wet winters and mild, wet summers. It is often windy and fog is frequently experienced. Lundy is in the USDA 9a plant hardiness zone.

Ecology

Flora

The vegetation on the plateau is mainly dry heath, with an area of waved Calluna heath towards the northern end of the island, which is also rich in lichens, such as Teloschistes flavicans and several species of Cladonia and Parmelia.

Other areas are either a dry heath/acidic grassland mosaic, characterised by heaths and western gorse (Ulex gallii), or semi-improved acidic grassland in which Yorkshire fog (Holcus lanatus) is abundant. Tussocky (Thrift) (Holcus/Armeria) communities occur mainly on the western side, and some patches of bracken (Pteridium aquilinum) on the eastern side.

There is one endemic plant species, the Lundy cabbage (Coincya wrightii), a species of primitive brassica.

By the 1980s the eastern side of the island had become overgrown by rhododendrons (Rhododendron ponticum) which had spread from a few specimens planted in the garden of Millcombe House in Victorian times, but in recent years significant efforts have been made to eradicate this non-native plant.

Fauna

Terrestrial invertebrates
Two invertebrate taxa are endemic to Lundy, with both feeding on the endemic Lundy cabbage (Coincya wrightii). These are the Lundy cabbage flea beetle (Psylliodes luridipennis), a species of leaf beetle (family Chrysomelidae) and the Lundy cabbage weevil (Ceutorhynchus contractus var. pallipes), a variety of true weevil (family Curculionidae). In addition, the Lundy cabbage is the main host of a flightless form of Psylliodes napi (another species of flea beetle) and a wide variety of other invertebrate species which are not endemic to the island. Another resident invertebrate of note is Atypus affinis, the only British species of purseweb spider.

Birds
The population of puffins (Fratercula arctica) on the island declined in the late 20th and early 21st centuries as a consequence of depredations by brown and black rats (Rattus rattus) and possibly also as a result of commercial fishing for sand eels, the puffins' principal prey. Since the elimination of rats in 2006, seabird numbers have increased and by 2019 the number of puffins had risen to 375 and the number of Manx shearwaters to 5,504 pairs.

As an isolated island on major migration routes, Lundy has a rich bird life and is a popular site for birdwatching. Large numbers of black-legged kittiwake (Rissa tridactyla) nest on the cliffs, as do razorbill (Alca torda), common guillemot (Uria aalge), herring gull (Larus argentatus), lesser black-backed gull (Larus fuscus), fulmar (Fulmarus glacialis), shag (Phalacrocorax aristotelis), oystercatcher (Haematopus ostralegus), skylark (Alauda arvensis), meadow pipit (Anthus pratensis), blackbird (Turdus merula), robin (Erithacus rubecula) and linnet (Carduelis cannabina). There are also smaller populations of peregrine falcon (Falco peregrinus) and raven (Corvus corax).

Lundy has attracted many vagrant birds, in particular species from North America. As of 2007, the island's bird list totals 317 species. This has included the following species, each of which represents the sole British record: Ancient murrelet, eastern phoebe and eastern towhee. Records of bimaculated lark, American robin and common yellowthroat were also firsts for Britain (American robin has also occurred two further times on Lundy). Veerys in 1987 and 1997 were Britain's second and fourth records, a Rüppell's warbler in 1979 was Britain's second, an eastern Bonelli's warbler in 2004 was Britain's fourth, and a black-faced bunting in 2001 Britain's third.

Other British Birds rarities that have been sighted (single records unless otherwise indicated) are: little bittern, gyrfalcon (3 records), little and Baillon's crakes, collared pratincole, semipalmated (5 records), least (2 records), white-rumped and Baird's (2 records) sandpipers, Wilson's phalarope, laughing gull, bridled tern, Pallas's sandgrouse, great spotted, black-billed and yellow-billed (3 records) cuckoos, European roller, olive-backed pipit, citrine wagtail, Alpine accentor, thrush nightingale, red-flanked bluetail, western black-eared (2 records) and desert wheatears, White's, Swainson's (3 records), and grey-cheeked (2 records) thrushes, Sardinian (2 records), Arctic (3 records), Radde's and western Bonelli's warblers, Isabelline and lesser grey shrikes, red-eyed vireo (7 records), two-barred crossbill, yellow-rumped and blackpoll warblers, yellow-breasted (2 records) and black-headed buntings (3 records), rose-breasted grosbeak (2 records), bobolink and Baltimore oriole (2 records).

Mammals

Lundy is home to an unusual range of introduced mammals, including a distinct breed of wild pony, the Lundy pony, as well as Soay sheep (Ovis aries), sika deer (Cervus nippon), and feral goats (Capra aegagrus hircus). Unusually, 20% of the rabbits on the island are melanistic compared with 4% which is typical in the UK.

Other mammals which have made the island their home include the grey seal (Halichoerus grypus) and the pygmy shrew (Sorex minutus). Until their elimination in 2006 in order to protect the nesting seabirds, Lundy was one of the few places in the UK where the black rat (Rattus rattus) could be found regularly.

Marine habitat
In 1971 a proposal was made by the Lundy Field Society to establish a marine reserve, and the survey was led by Dr Keith Hiscock, supported by a team of students from Bangor University. Provision for the establishment of statutory Marine Nature Reserves was included in the Wildlife and Countryside Act 1981, and on 21 November 1986 the Secretary of State for the Environment announced the designation of a statutory reserve at Lundy.

There is an outstanding variety of marine habitats and wildlife, and a large number of rare and unusual species in the waters around Lundy, including some species of seaweed, branching sponges, sea fans and cup corals.

In 2003 the first statutory No Take Zone (NTZ) for marine nature conservation in the UK was set up in the waters to the east of Lundy island. In 2008 this was declared as having been successful in several ways including the increasing size and number of lobsters within the reserve, and potential benefits for other marine wildlife. However, the no take zone has received a mixed reaction from local fishermen.

On 12 January 2010 the island became Britain's first Marine Conservation Zone designated under the Marine and Coastal Access Act 2009, designed to help to preserve important habitats and species.

Transport

To the island
There are two ways to get to Lundy, depending on the time of year. In the summer months (April to October) visitors are carried on the Landmark Trust's own vessel, MS Oldenburg, which sails from both Bideford and Ilfracombe. Sailings are usually three days a week, on Tuesdays, Thursdays and Saturdays, with additional sailings on Wednesdays during July and August. The voyage takes on average two hours, depending on ports, tides and weather. The Oldenburg was first registered in Bremen, Germany, in 1958 and has been sailing to Lundy since being bought by the Lundy Company Ltd in 1985.

In the winter months (November to March) the island is served by a scheduled helicopter service from Hartland Point. The helicopter operates on Mondays and Fridays, with flights between 12 noon and 2 pm. The heliport is a field at the top of Hartland Point, not far from the Beacon.

Properly equipped and experienced canoeists can kayak to the island from Hartland Point or Lee Bay. This takes 4 to 6 hours depending on wind and tides.

Entrance to Lundy is free for anyone arriving by scheduled transport. Visitors arriving by non-scheduled transport are charged an entrance fee, currently (May 2016) £6.00, and there is an additional charge payable by those using light aircraft. Anyone arriving on Lundy by non-scheduled transport is also charged an additional fee for transporting luggage to the top of the island.

On the island
In 2007, Derek Green, Lundy's general manager, launched an appeal to raise £250,000 to save the  Beach Road, which had been damaged by heavy rain and high seas. The fund-raising was completed on 10 March 2009.

Lighthouses

The island has three lighthouses: a pair of active lights built in 1897 and an older lighthouse dating from 1797.

Electricity supply
There is a small power station comprising three Cummins B and C series diesel engines, offering an approximately 150 kVA 3-phase supply to most of the island buildings. Waste heat from the engine jackets is used for a district heating pipe. There are also plans to collect the waste heat from the engine exhaust heat gases to feed into the district heat network to improve the efficiency further. The power is normally switched off between 00:00 and 06:30.

Staying on the island
Lundy has 23 holiday properties, sleeping between one and 14 people. These include a lighthouse, a castle and a Victorian mansion. Many of the buildings are constructed from the island's granite.

The island also has a campsite, at the south of the island in the field next to the shop. It has hot and cold running water, with showers and toilets, in an adjacent building.

The island is popular with rock climbers, having the UK's longest continuous slab climb, "The Devil's Slide".

Lundy has been designated by Natural England as national character area 159, one of England's natural regions.

Administration
The island is an unparished area of Torridge district in the county of Devon, but was formerly a civil parish. It forms part of the ward of Clovelly Bay. It is part of the constituency electing the Member of Parliament for Torridge and West Devon and was from 1999 to 2020 part of the South West England constituency for the European Parliament.

In 2013 the island became a separate Church of England ecclesiastical parish.

Stamps
Owing to a decline in population and lack of interest in the mail contract, the GPO ended its presence on Lundy at the end of 1927. For the next two years Harman handled the mail to and from the island without charge.

On 1 November 1929, he decided to offset the expense by issuing two postage stamps ( puffin in pink and 1 puffin in blue). One puffin is equivalent to one English penny. The printing of Puffin stamps continues to this day and they are available at face value from the Lundy Post Office. One used to have to stick Lundy stamps on the back of the envelope; but Royal Mail now allows their use on the front of the envelope, but placed on the left side, with the right side reserved for the Royal Mail postage stamp or stamps. Lundy stamps are cancelled by a circular Lundy hand stamp. The face value of the Lundy Island stamps covers the cost of postage of letters and postcards from the island to the Bideford Post Office on the mainland for onward delivery to their final destination anywhere in the world. The Lundy Post Office gets a bulk rate discount for mailing letters and postcards from Bideford.

Lundy stamps are a type of postage stamp known to philatelists as "local carriage labels" or "local stamps". Issues of increasing value were made over the years, including air mail, featuring a variety of subjects. Many are now highly sought-after by collectors. The market value of the early issues has risen substantially over the years. For the many thousands of annual visitors Lundy stamps have become part of the collection of the many British Local Posts collectors. The first catalogues of these stamps included Gerald Rosen's 1970 Catalogue of British Local Stamps. Later specialist catalogues include Stamps of Lundy Island by Stanley Newman, first published in 1984, Phillips Modern British Locals CD Catalogue, published since 2003, and Labbe's Specialised Guide to Lundy Island Stamps, published since 2005 and now in its 11th Edition. Labbe's Guide is considered the gold standard of Lundy catalogues owing to its extensive approach to varieties, errors, specialised items and "fantasy" issues.

There is a comprehensive collection of these stamps in the Chinchen Collection, donated by Barry Chinchen to the British Library Philatelic Collections in 1977 and now held by the British Library. This is also the home of the Landmark Trust Lundy Island Philatelic Archive which includes artwork, texts and essays as well as postmarking devices and issued stamps.

Cultural allusions
A ship named Lundy Island, 3,095 tons, was captured and sunk on 10 January 1917 by the SMS Seeadler, a windjammer of the German navy, flying the Norwegian flag.

Lundy figures in the 1919 novel Last of the Grenvilles (1919) by Frederick Harcourt Kitchin (published under his pseudonym, Bennett Copplestone).

The island is mentioned in a section of W. N. P. Barbellion's Journal of a Disappointed Man (1919), titled "On Lundy Island".

Lundy has prominently featured in John Bellairs' juvenile gothic mystery The Secret of the Underground Room (1990). The plot highlights several geographical and historical points of interest, including the (De) Marisco family.

In 2012, James May's Toy Stories featured the successful flight of a modified model B. A. Swallow (a self-propelled glider) from Ilfracombe on the British mainland to the island, a distance of 22 nautical miles.

In 2016, Lundy featured as one of the segments in "The Darkest Hour", Series 2 / Episode 4 of BBC Radio 4's Wireless Nights, with Jarvis Cocker.

One of the BBC Radio 4 shipping forecast weather areas (mentioned between Sole and Fastnet in the forecast) is named after Lundy.

See also
 Barbara Whitaker, former warden.
 Coins of Lundy
 Puffin Island

References

Further reading
 Davis, Tim & Jones, Tim (2007) The Birds of Lundy; illustrated by Mike Langman. Berrynarbor: Devon Bird Watching & Preservation Society and Lundy Field Society, 
  (pp. 38−68: "The murder of Henry Clement and the pirates of Lundy Island")

External links

 
 
 Lundy Field Society
 Lundy Birds
 Pete Robsons Lundy Island Site
 LundyCam
 Lundy Marine Reserve at Protect Planet Ocean
 More pictures of Lundy Island
 A trip to Devon's 'Puffin Island', Fast Track video feature story about Lundy, 4:15 (2011-09-23)
 

 
Islands of the Bristol Channel
Islands of Devon
National nature reserves in England
National Trust properties in Devon
Nature reserves in Devon
Sites of Special Scientific Interest in Devon
Sites of Special Scientific Interest notified in 1987
Special Areas of Conservation in England
Tourist attractions in Devon
Ports and harbours of the Bristol Channel
Barbary pirates
Invasions of England
Marine reserves of the United Kingdom
Philately of the United Kingdom
Natural regions of England
Shipwrecks of England
Island restoration
Car-free zones in Europe
Former civil parishes in Devon
Unparished areas in Devon
Torridge District
Pirate dens and locations
Island countries
Former kingdoms